The BBC Somali Service is a BBC World Service radio station transmitted in the Somali language and based in Broadcasting House in West London and in Nairobi, where most of the radio and digital operations are based. Most of the listeners live in the Horn of Africa and nearby regions. According to the station, it provides a key link between those in Somalia and those elsewhere.

History
Established on 18 July 1957 with two weekly programmes of 15 minutes each, the station made the broadcasts daily by September 1958, and on 1 July 1961 the two parts were joined and the programme time increased to 30 minutes. Increases in broadcast frequency have been made since. They currently broadcast 3 half-hour programmes and one 1-hour programme daily. The station has been developing local networks in all over Somali speaking areas in Somalia, Djibouti, the Somali region of Ethiopia and North Eastern Kenya plus the Somali diaspora all over the world. In August 2010 AllAfrica.com reported that Shabelle Media Network had started broadcasting some of the station's programmes.

Since Yusuf Garad left the BBC, the Somali service never returned to the management of a Somali professional. First, Andres Ilves had been appointed as acting head of the service for nearly two years then Josephine Hazeley, deputy head of BBC Africa, had been appointed as a caretaker. Following the recruitment process for a new BBC Somali Editor, Abdirahman Koronto  was offered the position of BBC Somali Output Editor, a position that was line managed by the then Editor of BBC Africa, Ibrahima Daine who was appointed as the acting editor of BBC Somali. A new role was created and advertised for a joint Swahili and Somali service based in Nairobi, Kenya. Caroline Karobia was named editor of the new service. In June 2017, the BBC decided to split the Swahili and Somali services. In August 2017, Abdullahi Abdi Sheikh was appointed as Editor, BBC Somali Service. On 28 October 2019, Abdullahi Abdi Sheikh resigned as editor. On 16 March 2020, Muhyadin Roble who worked at Radio Ergo (formerly IRIN SOMALI SERVICE) was appointed as editor of the service.

Praise
Charles Allen wrote in 1997 that in Somalia, a country having "three or four separate ruling factions, each with their own radio services", the station is the "one single voice which serves all Somali speakers, and keeps the idea of being Somali alive". The station is successful, Allan reports, partly because of their aim to have reporting originating in the Somali language, rather than having translations from English. Pierce Gerety, a UNICEF representative in Somalia, said it is the most important news source in the country, and that many of the citizens were listeners. Anthony Oldin contrasts its perceived unbiased reporting with the media in Rwanda during the 1994 genocide, in which news organisations spread misinformation and encouraged ethnic groups to kill one another. In partnership with the Africa Education Trust the station launched in March 2002 an educational programme in Somalia.

The station is important for Somalis in the United Kingdom, because they rely on it to connect to Somalia. A poll by the station found that 99 percent of Somalis in the UK listen to it. Somalis view radio listening as a social activity, and therefore listen in khat houses, mosques, and Somali shops.

Criticism
The station has, however, received criticism. Siad Barre, the president of Somalia, said in 1985 the station and the West had misrepresented his country, and criticised it for speaking to Somali dissidents who had hijacked a Somali Airlines plane.

In 2006, a former service member for over 30 years said the station's aim is to spread British propaganda and that they are keen to see Somalia split up.

In 2007, Jimma Times reported that people in Somalia were accusing the station of being biased, one person saying the station was engaging in a "media propaganda war".

In March 2010, Liban Ahmad, a former trainee at the BBC, accused the station of misleading listeners, citing examples of headlines from the station such as "Somaliland Guantanamo" and "Soomaali al Qaacida ah" (Al Qaida Somalis).

In April 2010, Ibrahim Sheikh-Nor, writing in Hiiraan Online, accused Omar of having excessive control over the station and of running it like a "proprietor outfit".

See also

 BBC Bangla
 BBC Hausa
 BBC Persian
 BBC Urdu
 Somali Broadcasting Corporation

References

Further reading 

 Allen, Tim; Seaton, Jean. (1999). The Media of Conflict: War Reporting and Representations of Ethnic Violence. Zed Books. p. 303. .

External links 
 BBC Somali 
 BBC Somali Service 

Somali Service
Somali-language radio stations
Radio stations established in 1957
Somalia–United Kingdom relations